Stephanie Barnard is an American politician who is a member of the Washington House of Representatives for the 8th district. Elected in November 2022, she assumed office on January 9, 2023, replacing Brad Klippert.

Career 
Since 2018, Barnard has worked as the government affairs manager for the Tri-City Regional Chamber of Commerce. She was elected to the Washington House of Representatives in November 2022 and assumed office on January 9, 2023.

References 

Living people
Washington (state) Republicans
Members of the Washington House of Representatives
Women state legislators in Washington (state)
People from Pasco, Washington
People from Tri-Cities, Washington
People from Franklin County, Washington
Year of birth missing (living people)